Transcontinental Air Transport (T-A-T) was an airline founded in 1928 by Clement Melville Keys that merged in 1930 with Western Air Express to form what became TWA.  Keys enlisted the help of Charles Lindbergh to design a transcontinental network to get government airmail contracts.  Lindbergh established numerous airports across the country in this effort.

History

On July 7, 1929, transcontinental trips began.  It initially offered a 48-hour coast to coast trip (trains by night, and planes by day in nine flights), with the first leg on the Pennsylvania Railroad overnight from New York City to Columbus, Ohio.  There, passengers boarded a Ford Trimotor aircraft at what is now John Glenn Columbus International Airport, and flew to Waynoka, Oklahoma. Then, passengers caught the Santa Fe Railway for an overnight trip to Clovis, New Mexico, where they would take a second Ford Trimotor flight to Los Angeles.  One-way fare from New York to Los Angeles was $352.

Cynics were to deride its TAT abbreviation as "Take A Train."

The Ford Trimotor service was one of the first to offer meals en route, provided by the Fred Harvey Company. It was also one of the first to be geared toward  passenger service (while most airlines at the time were focused on transporting air mail).

In its first eighteen months of operation, the company lost $2.7 million.  In 1929 it merged with Maddux Air Lines and in 1930, during what was to become the Air Mail scandal, it merged with Western Air Express to form Transcontinental & Western Air (T&WA). Western became an independent company once again in 1934. However, Transcontinental opted to retain the T&WA name, and eventually evolved into Trans World Airlines or TWA.

First air crash
On September 3, 1929, a westbound TAT flight crashed on Mt. Taylor in New Mexico, with loss of all aboard. The Associated Press said it was the first plane crash on a regular commercial land route. The September crash was the first of three serious accidents for TAT over the next five months.

Museum
The Western New Mexico Aviation Heritage Museum in Grants, New Mexico, has a restored light and arrow which was used to direct pilots along the way.

See also 
 List of defunct airlines of the United States

References

External links

Articles
American Heritage article
PBS Chasing Sun profile
Planes, Trains and a Downtown Auto Dealer by Jay Berman. Los Angeles Downtown News April 22, 2013
Biography of Clement Melville Keys 
Alphabetilately profile

Graphics
Atchison, Topeka, and Santa promotional brochure for Transcontinental Air Transport.
 PRR Commemorative Brass Presentation Paperweight for the opening of The First "Rail-Air" Transcontinental Passenger Service via the  Pennsylvania Railroad,  Transcontinental Air Transport,  & Santa Fe Railroad.  July 7, 1929 
Poster for the train-plane
Timetables

Trans World Airlines
Charles Lindbergh
Defunct airlines of the United States
Kansas City metropolitan area
Airlines established in 1928
Airlines disestablished in 1930
American companies established in 1928
1928 establishments in the United States